Manwich, a portmanteau of man and sandwich, is the brand name of a canned sloppy joe sauce produced by ConAgra Foods and Hunt's, introduced in 1969.  The can contains seasoned tomato sauce that is added to ground beef cooked in a skillet. It is marketed as a quick and easy one-pan meal for the whole family. Manwich's slogan is, "A sandwich is a sandwich, but a Manwich is a meal."

Manwich Heat & Serve was introduced in 2004.  It contains both the seasoned tomato sauce and ground beef in a microwavable bowl.

There are currently at least four different flavors of Manwich: Original, Bourbon BBQ, Bold, and Thick & Chunky.

References

Further reading

External links
 Official website

American sandwiches
Conagra Brands brands
Products introduced in 1969